The Merry Widow (German: Die lustige Witwe) is a 1962 Austrian-French musical film directed by Werner Jacobs and starring Peter Alexander, Karin Hübner and Gunther Philipp. It is based on the 1905 operetta The Merry Widow by Franz Lehár.

It was shot at the Sievering Studios in Vienna. The film's sets were designed by the art directors Fritz Jüptner-Jonstorff and Alexander Sawczynski.

Cast 
Peter Alexander as Danilo
Karin Hübner as Hanna
Gunther Philipp as Hugo
Maurice Teynac as André Napoleon Renard
Geneviève Cluny as Valencienne, Revuestar
Germaine Montero as Anna, Wirtin von "Chez Anna"
Ernst Waldbrunn as Testamentsvollstrecker
Harald Maresch as Baron Zeta
Herbert Kersten as Dr. Martin
Helmut Lex as Jack Bromfield
Darío Moreno as Camillo, Valenciennes Mann

References

Bibliography 
 Von Dassanowsky, Robert. Austrian Cinema: A History. McFarland, 2005.

External links 

1962 films
1962 musical comedy films
Austrian musical comedy films
French musical comedy films
1960s German-language films
Films directed by Werner Jacobs
Operetta films
Films based on operettas
Constantin Film films
Films shot at Sievering Studios
1960s French films